The Carlos Palanca Memorial Awards for Literature winners in the year 1997 (rank, title of winning entry, name of author):


English division
Short story
First prize: "The Amulet" by David C. Martinez
Second prize: "The Window" by Clinton Palanca
Third prize: "Welostit" by Ma. Romina M. Gonzales

Poetry
First prize: "Presence" by Ma. Luisa A. Cariño
Second prize: "Shadow in the Sun" by David C. Martinez
Third prize: "The Assassin and Other Poems" by Francis C. Macasantos

Short story for children
First prize: "How My Sister Turned Me Into a Worm" by Natasha Vizcarra
Second prize: "Fetch" by Victoria Estrella C. Bravo
Third prize: "Speedy and Jet" by Jeanne Lim

Essay
First prize: "On Presidential Portraits" by Manuel L. Quezon III
Second prize: "Mother of Stories" by Melba Padilla Maggay
Third prize: "The Inner Life" by Tomas C. Boquiren

Full Length Play
First prize: "Return to Santander" by Crispin Ramos
Second prize: "Dog Days in America" by Jorshinelle T. Sonza
Third prize: "Istorya ni Bonipasyo: Kasla Gloria Ti Hawaii" by Behn Cervantes

One-act play
First prize: No winner
Second prize: "A Daughter's Seed" by Jose Victor Z. Torres
Third prize: "The Guest is Reluctant But..." by Felix A. Clemente

Filipino division
Short story in Filipino
First prize: "Nang Gabing Mamatay ang Nana Soling" by Alvin B. Yapan
Second prize: "Ang Baliw" by Mayette Bayuga
Third prize: "Si Joe Cool Kasi" by Olivia L. Cantor

Poetry in Filipino
First prize: "Pink Guba at Iba Pang Alinignig" by Roberto T. Añonuevo
Second prize: "Larombata" by Khavn De La Cruz
Third prize: "Pagkapaso ng Puso, Mga Tula ng Pagsuyo" by Roberto Ofanda Umil

Short story for children in Filipino
First prize: "Salu-salo" by Susie R. Baclagon-Borrero
Second prize: "May Lugar Kaya sa Langit Para sa Asong Batik-batik?" by Teresita G. Hizon
Third prize: "Si Totoy sa Gubat ng Diwata" by Olivia L. Cantor

Essay in Filipino
First prize: "Reseta at Letra: sa Daigdig ng Isang Doktor-Manunulat" by Luis P. Gatmaitan, MD
Second prize: "Sa Aking Pinipintuho, Isang Sayaw ng Paghuhubad" by Glecy C. Atienza
Third prize: "Chapter Eight" by Ma. Josephine Barrios

Full-length play in Filipino
First prize: "In Karakter" by Aurora D. Yumul
Second prize: "Unang Ulan ng Mayo" by John Iremil Teodoro
Third prize: "Macho Motel" by Sid Gomez Hildawa

One-act play in Filipino
First prize: "Lakhan Bini" by Allan L.Palileo
Second prize: "Despidida" by Ma. Josephine Barrios
Third prize: "Rogad por Nosotros" by Jun F. Flavier Pablo

Teleplay
First prize: "Pula" by Jun Lana and Peter Ong Lim
Second prize: "23rd Floor" by Jun Lana
Third prize: "Par" by Edzel Cardil

Screenplay
First prize: "Daluyong sa Dibdib" by Al A. Puedan
Second prize: "Barber's Cut" by Jun Lana and Peter Ong Lim
Third prize: "West Side Avenue, JC" by Lav Indico Diaz

Iloko Short story
First prize: "Colorum" by Reynaldo A. Duque
Second prize: "Ti Ligsay, Ti Anniniwan, Ken Ti Daton" by Aurelio S. Agcaoili
Third prize: "Gita Dagiti Ledda" by Reynaldo A. Duque

Cebuano Short story
First prize: "Bugti" by Ernesto D. Lariosa
Second prize: "Hangtod Matapos Ang Gabi" by Ricardo I. Patalinjug
Third prize: "Sa Sabakan Sa Bukid" by Genaro Enad Tanudtanud

Hiligaynon Short story
First prize: "Kami nga Waay Diri, Waay Didto" by Alfredo R. Siva
Second prize: "Mga Luha Para Kay Tatay Jose" by Alice Tan Gonzales
Third prize: "Isa Ka Pompong Nga Rosas" by Alice Tan Gonzales

More winners by year

References
 

1997
Palanca Awards, 1997